Stevenage Clock Tower is a Grade II listed structure in Town Square in the centre of Stevenage New Town. A panel on the tower records the visit of Elizabeth II in 1959. The queen unveiled it as part of the ceremony to open the first phase of the town centre.

Designed by Leonard Vincent, the architect of Stevenage Development Corporation, the tower is 19 meters high. It is constructed of reinforced concrete with granite cladding. The fact that the concrete is not exposed gives the design a modernist rather than brutalist appearance. It has been described as "iconic".

In the 1970s a bronze relief sculpture by Franta Belsky was added to the west face of the clock tower.  It depicts Lewis Silkin, a Labour politician who served as Minister of Town and Country Planning implementing the New Towns Act of 1946 which set up development corporations to construct new towns.

Related structures

Structures in Stevenage
The tower is set in a pool with a fountain, which is also protected. The listing in 1998 applied to "clock tower and surrounding raised pool". There are two other listed structures in Town Square, the sculpture "Joy Ride" by Franta Belsky and a ceramic mural on the former Co-Operative House. Like the tower, these examples of public art were created in the 1950s.

Structures elsewhere
It is reminiscent of other English clock towers of the mid-20th century, such as the earlier Chrisp Street Market Clock Tower and the later example in Shipley.

Conservation and regeneration
In the 21st century a need has been identified to regenerate Stevenage town centre. Proposals include more housing and updated shops.  While this is unlikely to affect the Clock Tower directly, there is a possible threat to the character of the surrounding buildings.

Town Square is included in a Conservation Area, but Historic England regards it as vulnerable and in 2017 included it on the Heritage at Risk Register.

References

Clock towers in the United Kingdom
Grade II listed buildings in Hertfordshire
Concrete buildings and structures
Towers completed in 1959
Stevenage